Laguna Atascosa National Wildlife Refuge is the largest protected area of natural habitat left in the Lower Rio Grande Valley. The  refuge is located almost entirely in Cameron County, Texas (near Harlingen), although a very small part of its northernmost point extends into southern Willacy County.

Fauna
The Peregrine Fund began reintroducing captive-bred northern aplomado falcons (Falco femoralis septentrionalis) to the refuge in 1985, which had been nearly extirpated from the Southwestern United States; today, it is home to 26 pairs. Nine other endangered or threatened species inhabit the refuge, such as the Texas ocelot (Leopardus pardalis albescens) and (formerly) the Gulf Coast jaguarundi (Herpailurus yagouaroundi), rare wild cats. Programs at the refuge include vegetation and wetland restoration.

See also
Hilary Swarts, ocelot biologist at Laguna Atascosa

References

External links

U.S. Fish & Wildlife Service

National Wildlife Refuges in Texas
Lower Rio Grande Valley
Wetlands of Texas
Protected areas of Cameron County, Texas
Protected areas of Willacy County, Texas
Landforms of Cameron County, Texas
Landforms of Willacy County, Texas
Protected areas established in 1946
1946 establishments in Texas